The Balkan Cup was an international association football competition contested on and off from 1929 to 1980 by countries from the Balkans region. The most successful team was Romania with four titles.

Overview
The first edition featured Romania, Greece, Yugoslavia and Bulgaria and was played over three years from 1929 to 1931. All teams played each other twice, home and away, and were awarded 2 points for a win and 1 point for a draw, with final ranking table determining the winner. Romania won the first title with a game in hand after beating Yugoslavia 4–2.

In the following tournaments the system saw significant changes, with teams playing each other only once, and instead of taking three years to complete it was shortened to just a single week. From 1932 to 1936 the competition was played every year with the same four teams until the outbreak of World War II.

After a seven-year hiatus due to World War II, the competition was revived in 1946. Greece dropped out of the tournament the same year, and was replaced by Albania, who went on to win the 1946 edition by defeating Romania 1–0 in the final game. In 1947 Hungary entered the tournament and won it in its first attempt. Hungary were a world footballing power at the time and proved this with a 9–0 thrashing against Bulgaria. In 1948 the Balkan Cup was expanded to seven teams with Poland and Czechoslovakia joining the tournament. However, the 1948 edition was never completed due to unknown reasons. Hungary were topping the group at the time of its cancellation. Because of the expansions, the 1947 and 1948 tournaments were officially renamed Balkan and Central European Championship.

The competition was not played again until 1973 when a round robin group system was replaced by a knockout system with semi-finals and finals, played over three years. This time only four countries took part – Romania, Bulgaria, Turkey and Greece. Bulgaria won the final on away goals against Romania in 1976. In 1977 the second edition of the revived tournament was launched, this time consisting of five teams with Yugoslavia returning to take part. Romania went on to win the last edition in 1980 by beating Yugoslavia 4–1 at home in the final.

List of winners
Source

All-time top goalscorers

Managers with most wins

Titles by Nation

Participations

Hat-tricks
Since the first official tournament in 1929–31, 17 hat-tricks have been scored in over 50 matches of the 12 editions of the tournament. The first hat-trick was scored by Rudolf Wetzer of Romania, playing against Greece on 25 May 1930; and the last was by Anghel Iordănescu 50 years later, on 27 August 1980, when he netted a hat-trick for Romania in the second leg of the 1977–80 final in a 4-1 win over Yugoslavia. The record number of hat-tricks in a single Balkan Cup is four, during the inaugural edition. The only player to have scored more than one hat-trick is Ljubomir Angelov, both at the 1935 Balkan Cup, in which he was the top goal scorer with those 6 goals. The record for the most goals scored in a single Balkan Cup game is 5, which has been achieved once: by Rudolf Wetzer when he scored 5 for Romania in a 8-1 win over Greece. Romania also holds the record for most hat-tricks scored with 5, being closely followed by Hungary and Yugoslavia with 4 each. Bulgaria and Greece jointly hold the record for most hat-tricks conceded with 6 each, which means that only 5 hat-tricks have been scored against a team other than Bulgaria and Greece.

List

References

External links
RSSSF

 
Defunct international association football competitions in Europe
1929 establishments in Europe
Recurring sporting events established in 1929
Recurring sporting events disestablished in 1980
Sport in the Balkans
International men's association football invitational tournaments